Soulsearcher was a studio project based in England, created by record producer Marc Pomeroy.

Biography
In 1999, Pomeroy scored a No. 8 hit on the UK Singles Chart and a No. 20 Billboard Hot Dance/Club Play hit with "Can't Get Enough", featuring American singer-songwriter Thea Austin on vocals. The track was co-written by Austin and sampled the No. 1 Dance hit from 1979, "Let's Lovedance Tonight" by Gary's Gang. The track later featured in Grand Theft Auto: The Ballad of Gay Tony on the fictional in-game radio station Vladivostok FM.

They also released a single in 1999 titled "Do It to Me Again", which reached No. 32 on the UK Singles Chart.

In 2003, Soulsearcher returned to the club charts with "Feelin' Love", featuring vocals from Donna Allen.

Discography

Singles

References

External links
 Soulsearcher at Discogs

English record producers
English house musicians